Amix World is the first remix album of Japanese singer Ami Suzuki, released in March 2006.

Information
Most of the DJs that participated on this album are well known in Japan, and some are known in Europe and the United States, such as Jonathan Peters and Ferry Corsten.

The album was originally supposed to include only songs from Suzuki's first album under Avex, Around the World, but it was later decided to also include a remix of her single "Fantastic", which was released the same time as this album.

The album contains mainly trance and house music mixes, including seven remixes of the song "Around the World", plus remixes of Suzuki's previous singles "Delightful", "Eventful" and "Negaigoto".

The remix of "Eventful" made by Bulldozzer was only previously released online by Avex and this is the first time that this remix appeared on an official disc.

Chart performance
The album had little promotion and charted poorly, debuting at the number 83 position on the Oricon charts. In its first week of sales, only 2,662 copies were sold. In the second week, only 894 copies were sold and the album then slipped to 240th place.

Track listing

Charts

Ami Suzuki albums
2006 remix albums
Avex Group remix albums